The 1947-48 FA Cup is the 67th season of the Football Association Challenge Cup, or FA Cup for short. The large number of clubs entering the tournament from lower down the English football league system meant that the competition started with a number of preliminary and qualifying rounds. The 25 victorious teams from the Fourth Round Qualifying progressed to the First Round Proper.

Extra preliminary round

Ties

Replays

2nd replay

Preliminary round

Ties

Replays

1st qualifying round

Ties

Replays

2nd qualifying round

Ties

Replays

3rd qualifying round

Ties

Replays

4th qualifying round
The teams that entered in this round are: Barnet, Bishop Auckland, Yeovil Town, Bath City, South Liverpool, Gillingham, Guildford City, Chelmsford City, Cheltenham Town, Colchester United, Gainsborough Trinity, Shrewsbury Town, Scarborough, North Shields, Workington, Dulwich Hamlet, Walthamstow Avenue, Wellington Town, Runcorn, Stalybridge Celtic, Marine, Lancaster City, Bromley and Kidderminster Harriers.

Ties

Replays

1947–48 FA Cup
See 1947–48 FA Cup for details of the rounds from the First Round Proper onwards.

External links
 Football Club History Database: FA Cup 1947–48
 FA Cup Past Results

Qualifying
FA Cup qualifying rounds